Terence C. Kern (born 1944) is a senior United States district judge of the United States District Court for the Northern District of Oklahoma.

Education and career
Born in Clinton, Oklahoma, Kern received a Bachelor of Science degree from Oklahoma State University in 1966, a Juris Doctor from the University of Oklahoma College of Law in 1969, and a Master of Laws in Judicial Process from the University of Virginia School of Law in 2004. He was in the Oklahoma Army National Guard from 1969 to 1970 and the United States Army Reserve from 1969 to 1975. He was a general attorney of the Federal Trade Commission, Division of Compliance, Bureau of Deceptive Practices from 1969 to 1970. He was in private practice in Ardmore, Oklahoma from 1970 to 1994.

Federal judicial service

On March 9, 1994, Kern was nominated by President Bill Clinton to a new seat on the United States District Court for the Northern District of Oklahoma created by 104 Stat. 5089. He was confirmed by the United States Senate on June 8, 1994, and received his commission on June 9, 1994. He served as chief judge from 1996 to 2003. He assumed senior status on January 4, 2010.

Notable case

On January 14, 2014, Judge Kern held that the Oklahoma Constitution's definition of marriage as limited to "the union of one man and one woman" violates the Equal Protection Clause of the Fourteenth Amendment. The suit, Bishop v. Oklahoma, had been filed by two lesbian couples against the Tulsa County Clerk and others. The ruling has been stayed pending appeal. The amendment banning same-sex marriage was passed by the voters in 2004, and its legislative history was cited in the ruling.

References

Sources

1944 births
Living people
Judges of the United States District Court for the Northern District of Oklahoma
Oklahoma State University alumni
People from Clinton, Oklahoma
Military personnel from Oklahoma
United States district court judges appointed by Bill Clinton
United States Army personnel
University of Oklahoma College of Law alumni
20th-century American judges
21st-century American judges
United States Army reservists
Oklahoma National Guard personnel